Simon Rex Cutright (born July 20, 1974), is an American actor, rapper, comedian, and former model. Rising to fame as an MTV VJ, Rex later became an actor known for What I Like About You, starring in three films of the Scary Movie franchise, and National Lampoon's Pledge This!. He later developed a rap persona, Dirt Nasty, and had several solo albums and co-founded the hip-hop group Three Loco. In 2021, he received critical acclaim for his lead role in Sean Baker's drama film Red Rocket, winning the Independent Spirit Award for Best Male Lead.

Early life 
Rex was born in San Francisco, California, and raised in Alameda, the son of Zoe, an environmental consultant, and Paul, a relationship coach. He is Jewish.

Rex was an only child who grew up in the San Francisco Bay Area. Rex's father was a breath-work coach (in the tradition of alternative psychologist Stanislov Grof) who walked out on him when he was little. At age 18, he was attending community college and working at a potato-sack factory when he began dating and living with a model in Oakland.

Career

Early work in porn and on MTV (1993–1998) 
In 1993, aged 19, Rex responded to an advertisement in a Los Angeles magazine and agreed to be photographed nude for photographer Brad Posey and his Club 1821 studio. The following year, under the alias "Sebastian", he appeared in solo masturbation scenes for three Club 1821 pornographic films: Young, Hard & Solo #2, Young, Hard & Solo #3, and Hot Sessions III. Archive footage was used in the 2000 films Hot Sessions 11 and Hot Sessions 12. He says he took the job to pay for rent and food for his girlfriend's two-year-old son. One day, while driving her to castings and watching the child a casting director spotted Rex in the waiting room and the next day he was on a flight to Milan. In 1994 Rex went on a modeling tour for Tommy Hilfiger, before going on to appear in mainstream modeling gigs for Calvin Klein Inc, Versace, and Levi’s.

In 1995, MTV hired Rex to work as a VJ and kept him on the air for over two years.

Television breakout and film work (1999–2017) 

In 1999, he was cast in the comedy-drama television series Jack & Jill, which aired on The WB channel for two seasons. He appeared as Eli in the TV show Felicity and television guest appearances followed including Baywatch, Everwood, and Summerland.

Starting in 2002, Rex starred with Amanda Bynes in the sitcom What I Like About You. In 2006, he appeared on the Lifetime primetime telenovela Monarch Cove, which ran for fourteen episodes. From television into film, Rex has held the lead role in feature films including Scary Movie 3, 4, & 5, Hotel California, The Karate Dog, King of the Avenue, and Superhero Movie. Rex more recently starred alongside comedian Nick Swardson in the Comedy Central show, Typical Rick, which ran for two seasons from 2016 to 2017.

Music career (2005–2020) 

Rex entered the music industry in 2005 as a rap artist after becoming friends with and discovering Mickey Avalon. Rex adopted his alter ego Dirt Nasty and formed the rap group Dyslexic Speedreaders with Avalon & Andre Legacy. Rex both produced and was featured on the group’s hit song "My Dick". Again the group paired with Lil Jon to create the song "What Do You Say" which was featured in 2009’s blockbuster comedy film, The Hangover.

Rex was an investor in the New York City nightclub The Plumm with partners Noel Ashman, Samantha Ronson, Chris Noth, and others. It opened in 2006 and closed in 2009.

In 2007, Dirt Nasty released his self-titled debut album which included the songs 1980, Cracker Ass Fantastic & Dropping Names. His second album, 2011's Nasty as I Wanna Be, featured Ke$ha, LMFAO, Too Short, and Warren G. Rex's other musical projects under his Dirt Nasty alias include his third album Palatial, and the supergroup Three Loco which features Andy Milonakis and Riff Raff. As Three Loco, the group teamed up with producer Diplo and released the group’s eight-song EP on Diplo’s Mad Decent label.

Film career resurgence (2021–present) 

In Red Rocket (2021), Rex plays the lead in the comedy-drama as a washed-up ex-porn star who returns to his hometown where they are not exactly happy to see him. On October 23, 2020, The Florida Project director Sean Baker called Rex, whom he had never met, and convinced him to send an audition tape via iPhone with only five minutes to prepare. Rex then drove to Galveston, Texas without telling his agent to avoid having to quarantine after a flight with filming set to begin three days later. The film premiered in competition for the Palme d'Or at the 2021 Cannes Film Festival and Rex has received rave reviews and several awards.

In October 2021, as a result of the success of Red Rocket, Rex signed with the management firm Range Media Partners. He will next be seen in Down Low with Zachary Quinto and then Mack & Rita opposite Diane Keaton. He has also signed on to co-star in National Anthem.

He appeared in the April 2, 2022 episode of Saturday Night Live hosted by Jerrod Carmichael with musical guest Gunna, in the music video "Short-Ass Movies", where in addition to appearing as himself, his face is used for Ernest P. Worrell.

Personal life
In his late 40s, Rex reconnected with his father. They shared a "psychedelic experience" during which Rex learned his grandfather was a "spiritual leader" who was "not always the most faithful member of his flock."

Rex bought a house in Laurel Canyon after the success of Scary Movie 3, but he was living in a guesthouse in the Venice neighbourhood of Los Angeles when he was offered US$70,000 by British tabloids to falsely claim he had dated Meghan Markle, his co-star in Cuts. 

Tabloids speculated that he had dated Paris Hilton, but he insisted they were just "friends that held hands."

Rex lives off the grid in Joshua Tree, California, in the middle of the Mojave Desert.

Filmography

Film

Television

Music videos

Discography

Studio albums
 Catching Up to Wilt (with Mickey Avalon, Andre Legacy, and Beardo) (2004)
 Dirt Nasty (2007)
 Shoot to Kill (with Mickey Avalon, Andre Legacy, and Beardo) (2008)
 The White Album (with DJ Stretch Armstrong) (2010)
 Nasty as I Wanna Be (2010)
 Palatial (2013)
 The White Boys (with Andre Legacy and Beardo) (2014)
 Breakfast in Bed (with Smoov-e) (2015)
 Dirt Nasty Sux (2016)

Mixtapes
 The White Album (2010)
 Shoot to Kill Mixtape (with Mickey Avalon, Andre Legacy, & BEARDO) (2008)

Extended plays
 Extended Package (with Jack Splash as Chain Swangaz) (2011)
 ¡Three Loco! (with Andy Milonakis and Riff Raff) (2012)

Guest appearances
 Mickey Avalon – "My Dick" from Mickey Avalon (2005)
 Mickey Avalon – "What Do You Say" from Mickey Avalon (2006)
 Luckyiam – "Nevermind" from Most Likely to Succeed (2007)
 Verb – "1980 Gutter" from The East Side Extraterrestrial EP (2009)
 Mac Lethal – "My Cadillac" from Postcards from Kansas EP
 Kool Keith – "World Wide Lamper" from Feature Magnetic (2016)
 Pete Davidson - “Short Ass Movie” on SNL (2022)

Productions
 The Grouch & Eligh – "Can't Catch Me" from No More Greener Grasses (2003)
 Luckyiam – "Rap, Rap, Rap" from Most Likely to Succeed (2007)

Awards and nominations

References

External links
 
 
 Dirt Nasty official site

1974 births
20th-century American male actors
21st-century American male actors
American male comedians
American male film actors
Male models from California
American male rappers
Hip hop albums by American artists
American male television actors
Hip hop musicians from San Francisco
Living people
Male actors from San Francisco
Nightclub owners
Rappers from the San Francisco Bay Area
VJs (media personalities)
Comedians from California
20th-century American comedians
21st-century American comedians
21st-century American rappers
21st-century American male musicians